Ralston Creek may refer to:

Ralston Creek (Colorado)
Ralston Creek (Iowa)